Over Here may refer to:

 Over Here (TV series), a 1996 UK comedy-drama television serial
 Over Here!, a 1974 Broadway musical
 "Over Here!", song from Over Here!, musical
"Over Here", song by PartyNextDoor from PartyNextDoor (EP)

See also
 Over There (disambiguation)